Jente Hauttekeete (14 March 2002) is a Belgian athlete specializing in the heptathlon and the decathlon. 

Hauttekeete was born in 2002. His father, Hendrik Hauttekeete, was a long jumper and sprinter, while his mother Melanie Moreels, a 6-times Belgian champion, was a specialist of the 400m hurdles and the heptathlon.

At the 2019 European Youth Summer Olympic Festival, he won the silver medal in the decathlon, behind Sander Skotheim.

In February 2021, he broke the world record in his age group (the under-20) for the heptathlon, becoming the first to break the 6000 points barrier.

In 2021, he won the European Athletics U20 Championships, breaking his own Belgian record for his age group with 8150 points, which was also the best performance by an under-20 athlete that year, and the 4th-best ever.

In February 2022, Hauttekeete won the Belgian Indoor Championships in the heptathlon with a total of 5680 points.

Notes

Living people
Belgian decathletes
Belgian Athletics Championships winners
2002 births